Rocking Horse is the third solo album from singer-songwriter Kelli Ali and was released through One Little Indian Records on 24 November 2008 in the United Kingdom.

The album was produced by Max Richter, producer of Vashti Bunyan's album, Lookaftering, composer of The Blue Notebooks and winner of the European Film Academy Award for his score on Waltz with Bashir.

The album has been compared to Goldfrapp's album Seventh Tree.

The album's cover artwork is by Steven Wilson.

Track listing
"Dancing Bears" – 3:26
"One Day at a Time" – 5:01
"The Savages" – 3:23
"Heavens Door" – 5:04
"Urique" – 4:56
"Rocking Horse" – 3:21
"September Sky" – 5:32
"A Storm in a Teacup" – 5:01
"The Kiss" – 4:51
"Flowers" – 6:13
"Water Under the Bridge" – 3:16
"What to Do" – 3:36
"The Kiss Epilogue" – 1:44

Credits
Kelli Ali – vocals, lyrics
Max Richter – Piano, Hammond organ & Rhodes
Marc Pilley – Acoustic & Electric guitars & Banjo
Katherine Macintosh – Cor Anglais & Oboe
Ruth Morley – Flute
Simon Cottrell – Bass
Simon Rawson – Viola
Helen Duncan – Cello
Uli Fenner – 1st Violin
Sharleen Clapperton – Violin

References

Kelli Ali albums
2008 albums
One Little Independent Records albums